Max Mirnyi and Daniel Nestor were the defending champions but were beaten in the Quarterfinals by Mahesh Bhupathi and Rohan Bopanna.
Leander Paes and Radek Štěpánek won the title, beating Bhupathi and Bopanna in the final by the score of 6–7(7–9), 6–3, [10–5] .

Seeds
All seeds receive a bye into the second round.

Draw

Finals

Top half

Bottom half

References
 Main Draw

Shanghai Rolex Masters - Doubles
2012 Shanghai Rolex Masters